Justice Bradley may refer to:
Ann Walsh Bradley, associate justice of the Wisconsin Supreme Court
Charles S. Bradley, chief justice of the Rhode Island Supreme Court
James Bradley (judge), associate justice of the Nebraska Supreme Court
Joseph P. Bradley, associate justice of the Supreme Court of the United States (1870-1892)
Rebecca Bradley (judge), associate justice of the Wisconsin Supreme Court
Stephen R. Bradley, associate justice of the Vermont Supreme Court